The ground jays or ground choughs belong to a distinct group of the passerine order of birds in the genus Podoces of the crow family Corvidae. They inhabit high altitude semi-desert areas from central Asia to Mongolia.

Ground jays show adaptations to ground living such as long, strong legs adapted to fast running and the ability to leap and bound onto boulders and rocks with great agility. Their long, curved thick bills are adapted for digging and probing.

While capable of flight (which they do infrequently and relatively weakly), they prefer running, and will readily perch on trees and bushes also.

Species list

The ground tit (Pseudopodoces humilis), previously Hume's ground jay, has changed its placement within the Passeriformes recently because of molecular and osteological testing. It has now been placed into the Paridae.

Podoces